Demilich is a Finnish death metal band, which formed in the early 1990s and consists of frontman Antti Boman, guitarist Aki Hytönen, bassist Ville Koistinen, and drummer Mikko Virnes. Their debut album, Nespithe (1993), features intricate death metal riffs with unusually low, guttural vocals in the vocal fry register. The album contains long, complicated song titles and unconventional lyrics which were written in code in the booklet. 

Nespithe was featured in  Terrorizer's Secret History of Death Metal, in their list of "The 40 Albums You Must Hear"; they commented: "Even trying to scream your lungs out whilst vomiting a mix of haggis, outdated goat's cheese and kebab won't do. Tested extensively by Terrorizer's scientific team, we can now safely say that no normal human is capable of reproducing the effect-free vocal madness displayed by Antti Boman on these Finns' sole, totally unique, album."

Demilich played what was believed to be their last show on 22 July 2006 but performed many other shows since then, including appearances at Jalometalli Metal Music Festival and Maryland Death Fest.

History

Demilich was founded in 1990 by guitarist/vocalist Antti Boman and drummer Mikko Virnes, creating a unique avant-garde sound of technical death metal in A standard tuning, with extremely low-register vocals. Demilich recorded four demo tapes (some containing re-used material from previous demos) before creating their debut, Nespithe, in 1993. The band split up shortly after the release of the album due to complications with their record label and the album's profits. Demilich remained inactive until 2005 when they reformed and began playing live shows, as well as writing new material. This material would not be released to the public until 2014. Demilich played what was to be their last show in 2006, yet performed one-off shows in the following years. 

The compilation release 20th Adversary of Emptiness contains everything Demilich have ever recorded, starting from Regurgitation of Blood demo (1991) and rounding things off with three songs the band recorded during their brief comeback in 2006. The only Demilich full-length album Nespithe has been reissued several times over the years in various guises, but always using the inferior 16-bit CD masters and sometimes brickwalled beyond recognition. For this release the band dug up the original unmastered 24 bit studio tapes for Nespithe and best possible sources for the demo material, and then had Sami Jämsén of Studio Perkele thoroughly master these original unmastered mixes.

Discography

Studio albums
 Nespithe (1993)

Demos
 Regurgitation of Blood (1991)
 The Four Instructive Tales... of Decomposition (1991)
 ...Somewhere Inside the Bowels of Endlessness... (1992)
 The Echo (1992)

Compilation albums
 20th Adversary of Emptiness (2014)
 Em9t2ness of Van2s1ing / V34ish6ng 0f Emptiness (2018)

References

External links

 Current official website
 Previous website
[ Demilich] and [ Nespithe] at Allmusic

Musical groups established in 1990
Musical groups disestablished in 1993
Technical death metal musical groups
Finnish death metal musical groups